The Girl by the Roadside is a 1917 American silent mystery film directed by Theodore Marston and starring Violet Mersereau, Cecil Owen and Ann Andrews.

Cast
 Violet Mersereau as Judith Ralston
 Cecil Owen as Bud Ralston
 Ann Andrews as Vera Ralston
 Alan Edwards as Boone Pendleton 
 Robert F. Hill as Rayban
 Royal Byron as Billy Cartwright
 Kenneth Hall as Constable
 Sam B. Minter as Jake

References

Bibliography
 Robert B. Connelly. The Silents: Silent Feature Films, 1910-36, Volume 40, Issue 2. December Press, 1998.

External links
 

1917 films
1917 drama films
1910s English-language films
American silent feature films
American black-and-white films
Universal Pictures films
Films directed by Theodore Marston
1910s American films
Silent American drama films